Andrewesius is a genus of beetles in the family Carabidae, containing the following species:

 Andrewesius amicus Kryzhanovskij, 1995
 Andrewesius arlettae Morvan, 1998
 Andrewesius boulbeni Morvan, 1998
 Andrewesius cavazzutii Morvan, 1998
 Andrewesius coeruleatus Fairasaire, 1891
 Andrewesius delavayi Morvan, 1997
 Andrewesius fedorovi Kryzhanovskij, 1994
 Andrewesius glasaour Morvan, 1998
 Andrewesius ollivieri Morvan, 1997
 Andrewesius omeishanicus Kryzhanovskij, 1994
 Andrewesius pratti Bates, 1891
 Andrewesius remondi Morvan, 1997
 Andrewesius rougemonti Morvan, 1997
 Andrewesius subsericatus Fairmaire, 1886
 Andrewesius sycophanta Fairmaire, 1886
 Andrewesius szetschuanus Jedlicka, 1932
 Andrewesius vikara Andrewes, 1923
 Andrewesius vimmeri Jedlicka, 1932
 Andrewesius vulpinus Andrewes, 1923
 Andrewesius yunnanus Csiki, 1931
 Andrewesius zezeae Csiki, 1931

References

Platyninae
Taxa named by Herbert Edward Andrewes